Friedrich Glasl's model of conflict escalation assists in the analysis of conflicts. Appropriate reactions can be derived from this analysis. The model has nine stages – in contrast to the earlier model of Kurt R. Spillmann, which describes five distinct stages of escalation. These stages are grouped into three levels, which each contain three stages.

Levels 
Glasl represents "escalation in his nine stage model not as an ascent to higher and higher stages of escalation, but as a descent to deeper and deeper, more primitive and more inhuman forms of dispute... [which] inevitably leads into regions that evoke great 'inhuman energies' which are not ultimately amenable to human control or restraint." In the first level both parties can still win (win–win). In the second level one of the parties loses and the other wins (win–lose), and in the third level both parties lose (lose–lose).

Many different kinds of conflict can be thus analysed: divorces, conflicts between colleagues and school children, and also conflicts between states.

1st Level (Win–Win) 
 Stage 1 – Tension
Conflicts start with tensions, e.g. the occasional clash of opinions. This is a common occurrence and is not perceived as the start of a conflict. However, if a conflict should result the positions become more fundamental. The conflict could have deeper causes.

Stage 2 – Debate
From now on the conflict parties consider strategies to convince the counterparty of their arguments. Differences of opinion lead to a dispute. The parties try to put each other under pressure and think in terms of black and white.

 Stage 3 – Actions instead of words
The conflict parties increase the pressure on each other in order to assert their own opinion. Discussions are broken off. No more verbal communication takes place and the conflict is increasingly acerbated. Sympathy for "them" disappears.

2nd Level (Win–Lose) 
Stage 4 – Coalitions
The conflict is acerbated by the search for sympathisers for one's cause. Believing one has right on one's side, one can denounce the opponent. The issue is no longer important: one has to win the conflict so that the opponent loses.

Stage 5 – Loss of face
The opponent is to be denigrated by innuendo and the like. The loss of trust is complete. Loss of face means in this sense the loss of moral credibility.

Stage 6 – Threat strategies
The conflict parties try to gain absolute control by issuing threats which demonstrate their own power. One threatens, for example, with a demand (10 million euros) which is enforced by a sanction ("otherwise I′ll blow up your main building") and underlined by the potential for sanction (showing the explosive). The proportions decide the credibility of the threat.

3rd Level (Lose–Lose) 
Stage 7 – Limited destruction
One tries to severely damage the opponent with all the tricks at one's disposal. The opponent is no longer regarded as human. From now on, limited personal loss is seen as a gain if the damage to the opponent is greater.

Stage 8 – Total annihilation
The opponent is to be annihilated by all means.

 Stage 9 – Together into the abyss
From this point personal annihilation is accepted in order to defeat the opponent.

Strategies for de-escalation and conflict solution 
The model describes how two parties in a conflict behave. Solutions leading to de-escalation are not immediately apparent in this model, particularly when it appears to both conflict parties impossible to reverse the situation (e.g. an aggressive act on the territory of a state, separation of a common child from the other parent, withdrawal of nationality by a state, mass redundancy to improve shareholder value), or when one party selects conflict escalation as a strategic ploy.

To achieve de-escalation Glasl assigns the following strategic models to the different stages of escalation:
 Stage 1–3: mediation
 Stage 3–5: process guidance
 Stage 4–6: sociotherapeutic process guidance
 Stage 5–7: intercession, intermediation
 Stage 6–8: arbitration, court action
 Stage 7–9: forcible intervention

The ability to recognise and eliminate conflict-nourishing forces in a culturally neutral and non-judgemental fashion in order to de-escalate a conflict is highly advantageous in particular for managers, consultants and social workers.

See also 

 Business ethics
 
 Conflict escalation
 Conflict management
 De-escalation
 Delphinstrategie (in German)
 Dialogue
 Getting to Yes
 Karpman drama triangle
 Mediation
 Nonviolent Communication
 
 The War of the Roses (film)

References 

 Some translations from: Ruth Mischnick: "Nonviolent Conflict Transformation – Training Manual for a Training of Trainers Course" (the link, https://web.archive.org/web/20160304082001/http://library.deeep.org/record/777/files/DEEEP-BOOK-2014-473.pdf, now links to the web archive as primary link is no longer available as at 2020-07-14).

Bibliography 
 Friedrich Glasl: Konfliktmanagement. Ein Handbuch für Führungskräfte, Beraterinnen und Berater. Haupt, Bern 9. A.  2009, .
 Alexander Redlich: Konfliktmoderation in Gruppen (mit Lehrfilm auf DVD). Windmühle, Hamburg 7. A. 2009, .

Dispute resolution